is a Japanese manga series authored by Fujihiko Hosono. It tells the story about two molecular biologists, Koshigaya and Komada who take on humans with strange viruses that make them less human and more demonic. It was serialized in the Scola manga magazine Comic Burger.

The manga was also adapted into an hour-long single-episode anime OVA, produced by Madhouse Studios and Toei Video, directed by Yuzo Sato and scripted by Yoshiaki Kawajiri. It was distributed throughout the United States and Canada by Urban Vision. The English dub is distributed by MVM Films in the United Kingdom and Madman Entertainment in Australia and New Zealand.

Plot
Two scientists are attempting to distribute the cure for a demon virus that is affecting people all over Japan, however, things have become complicated. One of them has become infected. So begins his battle with himself, as he attempts to not only control his emerging demon side, but also to save the lives of others by wielding its great strength.

Characters
Komada

Koshigaya

Sayaka

Bokuda

Tabe

Mikawa

Mary

Boss

Police Officer

References

External links

1989 manga
1995 anime OVAs
Shapeshifter characters in comics
Horror anime and manga
Japanese horror films
Madhouse (company)
Seinen manga
Works by Fujihiko Hosono